The 2018–19 Amiens SC season was the 117th professional season of the club since its creation in 1901, and the club's 2nd consecutive season in the top flight of French football. It covered a period from 1 July 2018 to 30 June 2019. They participated in the Ligue 1, the Coupe de France and Coupe de la Ligue.

Players

Out on loan

Competitions

Ligue 1

League table

Results summary

Results by round

Matches

Coupe de France

Coupe de la Ligue

Statistics

Appearances and goals

|-
! colspan="16" style="background:#dcdcdc; text-align:center"| Goalkeepers

|-
! colspan="16" style="background:#dcdcdc; text-align:center"| Defenders

|-
! colspan="16" style="background:#dcdcdc; text-align:center"| Midfielders

|-
! colspan="16" style="background:#dcdcdc; text-align:center"| Forwards

|-
! colspan="16" style="background:#dcdcdc; text-align:center"| Players transferred out during the season

|-

References

Amiens SC seasons
Amiens SC